The Campeonato Nacional Sénior Feminino, currently inactive, is the top tier women's clubs competition in Angola. In 1997, a national championship was organized in Lubango, Huíla for the first time and on an experimental basis. Blocos FC, a team from Luanda was the winner.

In Luanda, ever since women's football tournaments began in 1993, over 30 clubs went out of business due to lack of support. At present, Progresso is one of the few, if not the only club to maintain a women's football team, even as official competition has halted.

History
The beginning of the 90's is registered as the beginning of the practice of semi-professional women's soccer in Angola, after independence.

The first experimental national championship was held in the city of Lubango, province of Huíla, in 1999, with the participation of six teams (three from Luanda and three from Huíla), ending up as National Champion by the Blocos Futebol Clube team.

The first provincial championship with an official character was held in Luanda in 1996, with the participation of 12 teams. The Grupo Desportivo da Oríon team won this edition of the unified Provincial Championship of Luanda.

The first attempt to organize women's football came in 1995, with the creation of an installation commission for women's football, which held an experimental championship in Luanda.

The following year, official competitions began in Luanda, under the tutelage of the Luanda Provincial Football Association, and later in the other provinces.
In Luanda alone, there were more than thirty women's football teams. Due to the large number of teams in Luanda, for some years the competition was played with two divisions, with the first division having 22 teams and the second 23 teams.

In the absence of institutional support to the sporting groups that emerged at the time and to national companies, many teams in Luanda ended up disappearing or merged with others.

Champions

1997

2005

2006

2007

9th place match

7th place match

5th place match

Semi-finals

3rd place match

Final

2008

Trivia
 In the 2008 edition, Progresso do Sambizanga thrashed the Moxico Provincial team 30-0. Irene Gonçalves, a Progresso striker scored 22 goals.

See also
 Taça de Angola
 Supertaça de Angola

References

External links
Futebol feminino - faf.co.ao

1
Women's association football leagues in Africa
Football competitions in Angola
Women
1997 establishments in Angola
Sports leagues established in 1997